Karel Christopher Campos Suárez (born 17 January 2003) is a Mexican professional footballer who plays as an attacking midfielder for Liga MX club América.

Club career
Campos joined the youth academy of Club América at the age of 13, and worked his way up their junior categories. He made his professional debut with Club América 0–0 Liga MX tie with Querétaro on 23 July 2021.

International career

Youth
Campos was called up to the under-20 team by Luis Ernesto Pérez to participate at the 2021 Revelations Cup, appearing in three matches, where Mexico won the competition. In June 2022, he was included in the under-20 squad, this time for the CONCACAF Under-20 Championship.

Senior
Campos was called up to the senior national team by Gerardo Martino on 26 October 2021.

Career statistics

Club

Honours
Mexico U20
Revelations Cup: 2021, 2022

References

External links
 
 

2003 births
Living people
Mexico youth international footballers
Club América footballers
Liga MX players
Association football midfielders
Mexico under-20 international footballers
Footballers from San Luis Potosí
People from Tamazunchale
Mexican footballers